Kluczewo may refer to:

Kluczewo Airfield, a former Soviet air base
Kluczewo, Szamotuły County in Greater Poland Voivodeship (west-central Poland)
Kluczewo, Masovian Voivodeship (east-central Poland)
Kluczewo, Wolsztyn County in Greater Poland Voivodeship (west-central Poland)
Kluczewo, West Pomeranian Voivodeship (north-west Poland)